North Komelik, also historically known as Gu Komelik, Komalik, Komelih, Komlih, and Kukomalik, is a populated place situated in Pinal County, Arizona, United States. The Board on Geographic Names originally designated the official name as Gu Komelik in 1947, before a final decision was made in 1978, changing the official name to the current North Komelik.

References

Populated places in Pinal County, Arizona